The 2010–2011 Cyclo-cross Superprestige events and season-long competition takes place between 10 October 2010 and 12 February 2011.

Results

Standings
In each race, the top 15 riders gain points, going from 15 points for the winner decreasing by one point per position to 1 point for the rider finishing in 15th position. In case of ties in the total score of two or more riders, the result of the last race counts as decider. If this is not decisive because two or more riders scored no points, the penultimate race counts, and so on until there is a difference.

External links
 Official website

S
S
Cyclo-cross Superprestige